Dahlerups Pakhus (English: Dahlerup Warehouse), originally known as Pakhus 1 (English: Warehouse 1), is a former Warehouse situated on the west side of the Langelinie Pier, opposite the Middle Pier, in Copenhagen, Denmark. Designed by Vilhelm Dahlerup, from whom it now takes its name, it was built between 1892 and 1893.

History
The Dahlerup Warehouse was originally known as Warehouse 1 and built as part of the Freeport of Copenhagen which was constructed during the first half of the 1890s.

After the free port was closed the building remained in use as a warehouse for a while but then fell into disrepair and was left empty for almost 30 years.

In the 1990s it was thoroughly renovated and is now listed as a landmark.

The Dahlerup Warehouse today
The building now houses the Danish Enterprise and Construction Authority, a government agency under the Minister of Economic and Business Affairs. It is also home to Denmark's Customs and Taxes Museum.

Gallery

References

External links

Warehouses in Copenhagen
Listed warehouses in Denmark
Listed buildings and structures in Østerbro
Vilhelm Dahlerup buildings
Port of Copenhagen